Cobalt(II) selenide is an inorganic compound with the chemical formula CoSe. The mineral form of this compound is known as freboldite. Similar minerals include trogtalite (CoSe2) and bornhardtite (Co2+Co3+2Se4).

References

Cobalt(II) compounds
Selenides
Nickel arsenide structure type